The North Carolina Tar Heels women's basketball team represent the University of North Carolina at Chapel Hill in the Atlantic Coast Conference of NCAA Division I women's college basketball. They are led by head coach Courtney Banghart, who is in her fourth season.

Home arenas 

While historic Carmichael Auditorium was under renovation, the women's team played the 2008–09 season at the Dean Smith Center to the south of campus.  The final game at the old Carmichael was an 82–51 rout of local rivals Duke in front of a sell-out 8,010 attendance, completing an unbeaten home and conference season. Upon reopening, the building's name was changed to Carmichael Arena.

Current roster

Retired and honored jerseys 

For a player to have her jersey honored and hung in the Carmichael Auditorium rafters, she must have been a first-team All-American, been a member of an Olympic team as an undergraduate, or been selected by the coaches as Most Valuable Player of a national championship team. For retiring a jersey, a player must be named national player of the year.

All-time record 

The women's basketball team was officially established in 1971 as part of the Department of Physical Education.  In 1974, basketball and several other women's sports came under the direction of the athletic department with Angela Lumpkin as coach.  Conference play began in 1978, with a first qualification for the NCAA tournament in 1983.

Conference tournament winners noted with #

|-style="background: #ffffdd;"
| colspan="8" align="center" | Atlantic Coast Conference

NCAA tournament results

See also
 1994 NCAA Division I women's basketball tournament

References

External links